For graphic design within the graphic arts industry, Punt Nua (English: New Pound) (sign: PN£) is a parody currency and internet meme devised by Irish graphic designer, Con Kennedy.

First published on the social media website, Twitter in early December 2011, within hours of publishing, the images became a viral sensation. Overnight, articles featuring the proposed designs for Punt Nua appeared in the Irish Independent and in the Carlow People. In the following days, Irish and international media picked up and ran with the story due to the notoriety of the people featured on the design of notes.

Concept and origins
Kennedy attributes the concept of Punt Nua was upon hearing numerous reports in the Irish media of a possible return to the Irish Pound after a possible exit from the Euro and decided to devise his own interpretation of what the new currency may look like.

The designs for the notes featured those who Kennedy and many in Ireland, believed were responsible for Ireland's economic problems and possible exit form the single currency.

Design
The designs of Punt Nua featured key figures from Irish political life and banking sector  that are synonymous with Ireland's economic meltdown and bank insolvencies:
 Bertie Ahern
 Brian Lenihan Jnr
 Charlie McCreevy
 Brian Cowen
 David Drumm
 Seán FitzPatrick

The Half Uncial typeface used on the proposed designs for Punt Nua was designed by Kennedy in the 1990s.

Media coverage

Irish media
The notes received great interest from Irish current affairs and light entertainment programmes and was featured on RTÉ's Saturday Night Show, The Daily Show  and current affairs programmes, such as Radio 1's Liveline, TV3's Tonight with Vincent Browne, 98FM News and Inside Ireland.

International media
Coverage of Punt Nua extended to intentional media such as Forbes.com, Stone & Strom Investment Managers Finnish television station YLE and Sydney's Irish Echo. Punt Nua also feature on the World Irish diaspora website as one of the top ten Irish events of 2011.

References

External links
Independent.ie news

Currencies of the Republic of Ireland
Internet memes
Parodies